Judge Benson may refer to:

Dee Benson (1948–2020), chief judge of the United States District Court for the District of Utah
Egbert Benson (1746–1833), judge of the United States Circuit Court for the Second Circuit
Henry N. Benson (1872–1960), probate judge in Nicollet County, Minnesota, before serving as Minnesota Attorney General
Paul Benson (judge) (1918–2004), judge of the United States District Court for the District of North Dakota

See also
Doug Benson (born 1962), American comedian and marijuana rights advocate who judged cases on the show, The High Court with Doug Benson
Justice Benson (disambiguation)